Giulia Gabba (born 20 February 1987) is a former professional tennis player from Italy.

Career
Gabba, a right-handed player, was born in the northwest Italian town of Casale Monferrato. Her junior career included a win over Victoria Azarenka, at a tournament in Santa Croce, Italy.

All of her main-draw appearances on the WTA Tour were in doubles, most notably at Palermo in 2006, where she and Alice Canepa made it through to the final. The pair, who were featuring in the draw as qualifiers, were beaten in the final by Janette Husárová and Michaëlla Krajicek. Her regular doubles partner on the WTA Tour was Sara Errani. As a singles player, she had wins over both Barbora Strýcová and Kirsten Flipkens at the $75,000 Ortisei tournament in 2007. Later in the year she defeated Alize Cornet en route to the quarterfinals of the $100,000 Tiro A Volo ITF event, after which she broke into the world's top 200.

She won a total of eight doubles titles on the ITF circuit.

WTA career finals

Doubles (0-1)

ITF finals

Singles (0–4)

Doubles (8–5)

References

External links
 
 

1987 births
Living people
Italian female tennis players
People from Casale Monferrato
Sportspeople from the Province of Alessandria
21st-century Italian women